Joseph Yehuda Halpern (born 1953) is an  Israeli-American professor of computer science at Cornell University. Most of his research is on reasoning about knowledge and uncertainty.

Biography
Halpern graduated in 1975 from University of Toronto with a B.S. in mathematics. He went on to earn a Ph.D. in mathematics from Harvard University in 1981 under the supervision of Albert R. Meyer and Gerald Sacks. He has written three books, Actual Causality, Reasoning about Uncertainty, and Reasoning About Knowledge and is a winner of the 1997 Gödel Prize in theoretical computer science and the 2009 Dijkstra Prize in distributed computing.

From 1997 to 2003 he was editor-in-chief of the Journal of the ACM.

In 2002 he was inducted as a Fellow of the Association for Computing Machinery and in 2012 he was selected as an IEEE Fellow.
In 2011 he was awarded a Senior Fellowship of the Zukunftskolleg at the University of Konstanz.

In 2019, Halpern was elected a member of the National Academy of Engineering for methods of reasoning about knowledge, belief, and uncertainty and their applications to distributed computing and multiagent systems.

Halpern is also the administrator for the Computing Research Repository, the computer science branch of arXiv.org, and the moderator for the "general literature" and "other" subsections of the repository.

His students include Nir Friedman, Daphne Koller, and Yoram Moses.

References

External links
Joe Halpern's homepage
Google scholar profile

Cornell University faculty
Gödel Prize laureates
20th-century American Jews
Dijkstra Prize laureates
Fellows of the Association for the Advancement of Artificial Intelligence
Fellows of the Association for Computing Machinery
Fellow Members of the IEEE
American computer scientists
Researchers in distributed computing
University of Toronto alumni
Harvard University alumni
Artificial intelligence researchers
Living people
1953 births
IBM Research computer scientists
IBM employees
21st-century American Jews